In association football, the 1964 Scottish League Cup final was played on 24 October 1964 at Hampden Park in Glasgow and it was the final of the 19th Scottish League Cup competition. The final was an Old Firm derby contested by Rangers and Celtic. Rangers won the match 2–1, with Jim Forrest scoring both of the Rangers goals. Jim Baxter was the Rangers captain that day, Jim Kennedy was the Celtic captain.

Forrest had also scored both of the Rangers goals in their semi-final victory against Dundee United.

Match details

References

External links 
 Soccerbase

1964
League Cup Final
Scottish League Cup Final 1964
Scottish League Cup Final 1964
1960s in Glasgow
Old Firm matches
October 1964 sports events in the United Kingdom